Arenaria balearica, the mossy sandwort, is a species of flowering plant in the family Caryophyllaceae, native to the Balearic Islands, Corsica, Sardinia and mainland Italy. It was first described by Carl Linnaeus in 1768.

References

balearica
Flora of the Balearic Islands
Flora of Corsica
Flora of Sardinia
Flora of Italy
Plants described in 1768
Taxa named by Carl Linnaeus